The final round of the 2019 FIBA Basketball World Cup was the knockout stage of the competition. The top two teams from Groups I, J, K, and L in the second round qualified for the single-elimination tournament. Quarterfinal losers were relegated to the classification stage for 5th–8th places.

All times are local (UTC+8).

Qualified teams

Bracket

Quarter-finals

Argentina vs. Serbia

Spain vs. Poland

United States vs. France
France snapped Team USA's 58-game winning streak in international competition that dated back to the bronze-medal game at the 2006 FIBA World Championship.

Australia vs. Czech Republic

Classification semi-finals

Serbia vs. United States

Poland vs. Czech Republic

Semi-finals

Spain vs. Australia

Argentina vs. France

Seventh place match

Fifth place match

Bronze medal match

Final

References

External links
Official website

final round